The qualification for the 2012 Women's Olympic Handball Tournament is held from December 2010 to May 2012.

Qualification summary

 *  Sweden qualified as 2010 European Championship runner up because Norway qualified as the 2011 World Champion.

World Championship

Notes: 
The six best teams not yet qualified for the 2012 Olympic Games are qualified for one of the three World Olympic qualification tournaments (each one hosted by one of the three best teams).
Qualification to the Olympic qualification tournament through the World Championship supersedes qualification through the Continental Championship.

Continental qualification

Europe (1st ranking continent)

Notes: 
Norway is both European and World Champion, so Sweden goes directly to the Olympic Tournament in London on the European Champions spot.

America (2nd ranking continent)

 Winner goes to the Olympic Tournament, the runner-up and third (since Australia placed 24th) go to one of the qualification tournament

Africa (3rd ranking continent)

 Winner goes to the Olympic Tournament, the runner-up goes to one of the qualification tournament

Asia (4th ranking continent)

 Winner goes to the Olympic Tournament, the runner-up goes to one of the qualification tournament

2012 IHF Qualification Tournaments 

Note :

 Continents are ranked based on the 2011 World Championship results.
 If the Oceania representative at the 2011 World Championship had placed from 8th to 12th, Oceania would have earned a spot for IHF Qualification Tournament #3 : Oceania’s representative (Australia) placed 24th so, Dominican Republic, 3rd from Continent 2 (3rd place Americas 2011), are qualified.

2012 IHF Qualification Tournament #1 

Venue:  Palais des Sports de Gerland, Lyon, France
All times are Central European Time (UTC+01:00).

2012 IHF Qualification Tournament #2 

Venue:  Palacio Multiusos de Guadalajara, Guadalajara, Spain
All times are Central European Time (UTC+01:00).

2012 IHF Qualification Tournament #3 

Venue:  Gigantium, Aalborg, Denmark
All times are Central European Time (UTC+01:00).

References

Qualification System

External links
2012 Olympic Handball Qualification – Women (Format and Results)
Official website of the IHF Women's Qualification Tournament #1
Official website of the IHF Women's Qualification Tournament #2
Official website of the IHF Women's Qualification Tournament #3

Handball Women
Olympic Qualification Women
Olympic Qualification Women
Q
Olympics
Olymp
Women's events at the 2012 Summer Olympics